Dermatoosteolysis, Kirghizian type is a rare presumably autosomal recessive genetic disorder characterized by the infancy-onset recurrence of the following symptoms: cutaneous ulcers, generalized arthralgia, fevers, peri-articular fistulous osteolysis, agenesis of all teeth, dystrophied nails, and keratitis. It usually decreases in severity around childhood but around that time complications have already developed, this includes skin scarring, arthroses, pseudo-acromegalic hands and feet, scoliosis, and vision loss. It has been described in 5 siblings born to healthy parents in Kyrgyzstan.

References 

Genetic diseases and disorders
Autosomal recessive disorders
Cutaneous conditions
Osteopathies
Developmental tooth disorders
Health in Kyrgyzstan